Bryghuset Møn is a micro-brewery in the town of Stege on the Danish island of Møn. Bryghuset Møn is also a restaurant and café. It opened in 2005 in a historic trading establishment, its master brewer being Svend Austel of Bamberg, Germany. The brewery produces nine different kinds of beer.

In December 2012, the establishment was acquired by David Jensin, a chef, and Thomas Stecher who already run Café Sommerspiret at GeoCenter Møns Klint.

References

External links
 Official website

Breweries in Denmark
Møn
Companies based in Vordingborg Municipality
Danish companies established in 2005
Tourist attractions in Region Zealand